Katayoon Shahabi (born 1968) is an Iranian film producer and CEO of Shahrzad Media International. In April 2016 she was named as one of the jury members for the main competition section of the 2016 Cannes Film Festival.

References

External links

Shahrzad Media International in Trade Promotion Organization Of Iran

1968 births
Living people
Iranian women film producers